Robert L. Thoburn was a Presbyterian clergyman, Virginia legislator, and founder of the Fairfax Christian School. He lived from 1929 to 2012.

Biography
Thoburn was born May 19, 1929, in Harrisville, Ohio, and was one of 11 children. He graduated from what is now Muskingum University and later Westminster Theological Seminary, and in 1955 he was ordained an Orthodox Presbyterian minister.  He moved to Fairfax, Virginia, in 1959.

In 1961, he founded the Fairfax Christian School. In 1975, he wrote the book, "How to Establish and Operate a Successful Christian School", based on his experiences founding numerous Christian schools.

In 1984, his second book, "The Christian and Politics", he argued that Christians should become more active in politics.

He ran for the US House of Representatives twice, in 1976 and 1978, failing both times. In 1977, he was elected to the Virginia House of Delegates as a Republican.

Thoburn was a member of the John Birch Society.

He died Dec 23, 2012 in his home in Vienna of cancer. Surviving him were his wife of 60 years, 8 children, 46 grandchildren, and 19 great-grandchildren.

References

People from Virginia
American clergy
American Presbyterians
John Birch Society members
Virginia Republicans